The 2018–19 AEK B.C. season is AEK's 62nd season in the top-tier level Greek Basket League. AEK competed in four different competitions during that season.

Transfers 2018–19

Players In 

|}

Players Out 

|}

Friendlies

Competitions

Overall

Overview

Greek League

League table

Results summary

Results by round

Regular season

Results overview

Quarterfinals

Semifinals

Third Place

Greek Cup

 Round of 16

 Quarterfinals

FIBA Champions League

Regular season - Group C

Results summary

Results by round

Regular season

Results overview

Round of 16

Quarterfinals

FIBA Intercontinental Cup
 Final Four

References

AEK B.C. seasons
2018–19 in European basketball by club